Below is a list of records held in Bellator MMA.

Fighting

Most bouts

In any bout

All fighters

By division

In a title bout

All fighters

By division

Winning

Most wins

In any bout

All fighters

By division

In a title bout

All fighters

By division

Longest winning streaks

Championships

Most title reigns

 Bold – Active reign.

Most single reign title defenses

 Bold – Active reign.

By division

 Bold – Active reign.

Most combined reign title defenses

 Bold – Active reign.

By division

 Bold – Active reign.

Multi-division champions
Fighters who have won championships in multiple weight classes.

 Joe Warren is the first champion to hold belts in two different divisions and Ryan Bader is the first fighter to hold multiple titles simultaneously.

 Bold – Active reign.

See also
 Bellator MMA
 List of Bellator MMA events
 List of Bellator MMA champions
 List of current Bellator fighters
 List of Bellator MMA alumni

External links
Bellator

Bellator MMA
Mixed martial arts lists
Sports records and statistics